Yevgeny Lebedev or Yevgeni Lebedev may refer to:

 Yevgeni Lebedev (1917–1997), Soviet and Russian actor and pedagogue
 Yevgeny Lebedev (politician) (born 1957), Russian politician
 Evgeny Lebedev (born 1980), Russian-British businessman
 Yevgeniy Lebedev (born 1981), Russian sprinter
 Yawhen Lebedzew (born 1994), Belarusian footballer